B 018, also pronounced in French B Zero Dix-Huit, is a nightclub that was established in 1994 in Beirut, Lebanon.

Today, by staying true to its claim, "A Sound Ritual", B 018 offers an array of nights. From live bands to 80s night during the week and international and local house DJs on the weekends, the club feeds everything heart and ears desire.

History
In the 1980s while Lebanon was still amidst war, Naji Gebran believed in music as therapy to ease the stress of the war. He started organizing parties, under the name Musical Therapy, at his chalet. According to Bethan Ryder in his book, Bar and Club, parties were later code-named B 018 due to the chalet's location 18 kilometers north of Beirut. Others have attributed the name, B 018, to the security, access-code number of the chalet. Another urban legend claimed that the number or the address of the chalet was B 018. In any case, the parties became so popular and overcrowded that in 1993, Naji moved them to a warehouse in an industrial area of Sin El Fil in 1994. The club was then officially Christened B 018 the venues predominant musical policy during its first incarnation was centered on contemporary and traditional Arabic music, Acid Jazz, Jazz and World Music sounds.

In 1998, Bernard Khoury was hired to build a new home for B 018 at the Quarantaine, the neighborhood that witnessed some of the most horrific atrocities during the war. The plot of land where the club was built was believed to be the site of the former Palestinian camp. In his design, Khoury wanted to arouse bottled-up remembrances of the war and that was expressed in the club itself, which was sunk in the ground like a communal grave, and seats inside were shaped like coffins. The design of B 018 has been labeled as "war architecture". The design included a circular iron plate that could be moved to cover the entire hypogeal night club at closing time so that from a bird's-eye view, the club resembled a helicopter landing pad. During operation hours, the same covering plates could be lifted up, transforming the club into an open-air discothèque where revelers on the underground dance floor found themselves suddenly dancing under the starry sky of Beirut and their gyrating movements where reflected on the mirrored surfaces of the plates.

Atmosphere
The club is one of Beirut's most popular discothèques. Known for its liberal atmosphere, the club has always been popular with artists and gay and lesbian patrons. It is often frequented by international celebrities such as, Naomi Campbell and Dee Dee Bridgewater. Wallpaper magazine chose B018 as one of the best clubs in the world in 2004, 2005, and 2006. Local and international DJ's, like Danny Howells and Lee Burridge, have played at the club.

Academic discourse
The club was the subject of Bernard Khoury's lecture, "New Wars in Progress" that was given at the University of Michigan's, School of Art & Design in 2009.

It was also the subject of Khoury's lecture, "Combat Architecture", for the Lebanese Club at MIT in the Massachusetts Institute of Technology.

In fiction
The Cyclist: A Novel by Viken Berberian
As I ride to B 018, a stench more putrid than death permeates the night. It tickles my urge for a steak, causes my appetite to ache. B 018 is an industrial dance club tucked in a deserted district called The Quarantine.

See also

List of electronic dance music venues
 Superclub

References

External links
Core Magazine
B 018,  Official Website, discontinued since 2012
B 018, Official Facebook Page with recent information
Bernard Khoury's "New Wars in Progress" Lecture at University of Michigan, School of Art & Design
Bernard Khoury's "Combat Architecture" Lecture to Lebanese Club @ MIT in the Massachusetts Institute of Technology

Nightclubs in Lebanon
Buildings and structures in Beirut
Electronic dance music venues